Agladrillia ukuminxa is a species of sea snail, a marine gastropod mollusk in the family Drilliidae.

Description
The length of the shell attains 9 mm.

Distribution
This marine species occurs along Transkei, South Africa.

References

  Kilburn, R. N. "Turridae (Mollusca: Gastropoda) of southern Africa and Mozambique. Part 4. Subfamilies Drilliinae, Crassispirinae and Strictispirinae." Annals of the Natal Museum 29.1 (1988): 167–320

Endemic fauna of South Africa
ukuminxa
Gastropods described in 1988